Gary Adams (born September 4, 1939) is an American former college baseball coach, the head baseball coach of the UCLA Bruins from 1975–2004.  Adams also served as the first head coach at UC Irvine from 1970–1974, winning two Division II national championships there.

Adams attended UCLA, where he played baseball from 1959–1962.  After his playing career, Adams was an assistant coach at UC Riverside from 1965–1968 before becoming a head coach.

Coaching career
Adams was named the first head coach of the Division II UC Irvine baseball program prior to the 1970 season.  Under Adams, the Anteaters reached the Division II NCAA Tournament in each of the program's first five seasons.  In both 1973 and 1974, the team advanced to the College World Series and won the Division II National Championship.

Adams replaced Art Reichle as the head coach at UCLA following the 1974 season.  Adams coached at UCLA for 30 seasons, appearing in 11 NCAA Tournaments and the 1997 College World Series.  Adams retired following the 2004 season and was replaced by then-UC Irvine head coach John Savage.

Adams has coached big league greats such as Eric Karros, Todd Zeile, Troy Glaus, Chase Utley, Eric Byrnes and Casey Janssen.

Head coaching record

Writing, Wine Making and Family
After spending 41 years coaching college baseball, retirement brought on a new set of challenges and opportunities. With five daughters now grown and gone, there has been plenty of time on Gary's hands, and he and his wife, Sandy, have embarked on an exciting new life – publishing books and a new passion, growing high- quality Syrah grapes for wine. Currently, The Adams’ are in their tenth season of producing estate Syrah and third season of Malbec. Adams has five children's books available, as well as the hard cover book, "Conversations With Coach Wooden" a book that brings delightful stories and surprises to the readers about the great coach, great man and even greater friend John Wooden.

Adams has five daughters, Kristy, Kimberly and Katherine (previous marriage); Jessica and Audrey.

Notes
 Adams has written number of books, including Conversations with Coach Wooden, and children's books, The Ladybug Story, So Flat, So Deep, So Far, and The Little Clock Who Had No Hands.

See also
List of college baseball coaches with 1,100 wins

References

External links
 Gary Adams' Books website

1939 births
UCLA Bruins baseball players
UC Riverside Highlanders baseball coaches
UC Irvine Anteaters baseball coaches
UCLA Bruins baseball coaches
Living people
Sportspeople from Hamilton, Ohio